Edward Peter Gallogly (August 28, 1919, Providence, Rhode Island – April 18, 1995, Norwich, Connecticut) was an American politician who served as Lieutenant Governor of Rhode Island for four years and as chief judge of the Rhode Island Family Court for 17 years.

Biography
Gallogly was born in Providence, Rhode Island in 1919, one of nine children of Lawrence and Rose ( Mimnaugh) Gallogly. He graduated from Providence College in 1942 and from Boston University Law School in 1949.

World War II
In 1943, he enlisted in the United States Navy and saw action in the European Theatre, including the D-Day landing at Normandy, and in the Pacific Theatre at the Philippines and Okinawa. He was discharged from active duty with the rank of lieutenant, but continued service in the Naval Reserve teaching courses in international law, international relations, and military justice at the Naval Reserve Officers School then located at Fields Point.

Career
A lifelong Democrat, he became active in local politics and was elected as a state senator in 1954 as a Democrat.  He was elected Lieutenant Governor of Rhode Island in 1960 and was re-elected in 1962. He served from January 1961 to January 1965. He was an unsuccessful candidate for Governor of Rhode Island in 1964 when he was defeated by incumbent Governor John Chafee.

President Lyndon B. Johnson appointed Gallogly United States Attorney for the District of Rhode Island in 1967. He served in that position until he became chief judge of the Rhode Island Family Court in 1969. He retired from the bench in 1986 after 17 years.

Death
Gallogly died at his home in Wakefield, Rhode Island on April 18, 1995, aged 75.

Family
Gallogly was married to Florence (Giblin) Gallogly. They were the parents of eight sons and three daughters. At the time of his death, he was survived by his wife, 11 children, 23 grandchildren, and five siblings.

References

Lieutenant Governors of Rhode Island
Providence College alumni
Boston University School of Law alumni
Rhode Island Democrats
Rhode Island state court judges
United States Attorneys for the District of Rhode Island
1919 births
1995 deaths
20th-century American judges